Sandra Springer Oudkirk is a United States diplomat currently serving as Director of the American Institute in Taiwan (AIT), the de facto embassy of the United States in Taiwan. She is the first woman to hold the role. Oudkirk's prior appointments include U.S. Senior Official for APEC and Deputy Assistant Secretary of State for Australia, New Zealand, and the Pacific Islands in the Bureau of East Asian and Pacific Affairs.

Early life and education
Oudkirk was born and raised in Tampa, Florida. She is a graduate of Georgetown University's Walsh School of Foreign Service.

Career
Oudkirk started working for the US State Department in 1991. She has served consular assignments in Taipei and Dublin as well as assignments in Turkey, Jamaica, and China.  Oudkirk's prior appointments include U.S. Senior Official for APEC and Deputy Assistant Secretary for Australia, New Zealand, and the Pacific Islands. In October 2019, she attended the Pacific Islands Dialogue and the Yushan Forum where she emphasized the need for diplomatic ties between Taiwan and its Pacific allies.

American Institute in Taiwan
Oudkirk was appointed Director of the American Institute in Taiwan (AIT), the de facto embassy of the United States in Taiwan, on July 8, 2021. She is the first woman to hold the role. Oudkirk formally took office on July 15, 2021.

Personal life
Oudkirk is fluent in Mandarin Chinese and Turkish. She is married to Scott McConnin Oudkirk, with whom she served at Embassies in Beijing and Ankara. Their 3 children, Andy, Olivia and Thomas, were born in Turkey.

References

Year of birth missing (living people)
Living people
American women diplomats
American diplomats
United States Department of State officials
Directors of the American Institute in Taiwan
People from Tampa, Florida
Walsh School of Foreign Service alumni
21st-century American women